Ippitsusai Bunchō was a Japanese ukiyo-e artist, best known for his yakusha-e actor prints in narrow hosoban dimensions.  Bunchō and Katsukawa Shunshō are credited with having developed kabuki actor portraiture focuses on producing likenesses of the subjects, rather than stereotyped faces.

Little is known about Bunchō's life.  His birth surname was Mori, and he is believed to have studied painting under Ishikawa Yukimoto of the Kanō school.

The earliest known works attributed to Bunchō are the illustrations to Hachimonji Jishō II's Eiga asobi nidai otoko (1755).  Between 1766 and 1774 he made a large number of actor prints in the narrow vertical hosoban dimensions.  In 1770 he produced the three-volume Ehon butai ōgi ("Picture-book of Stage Fans") with Katsukawa Shunshō, which depicts the leading kabuki actors of the day on ōgi hand fans; Bunchō handled the onnagata—male actors who portray female characters.  It was popular and went through multiple printings.

From 1769 he also made bijin-ga prints of female beauties that show the influence of Suzuki Harunobu.  These became his major subject, and in the An'ei era (1772–81) no actor prints of his are known.

Bunchō's last known work was an e-goyomi picture calendar from 1790.  He had few students, one of whom was Kishi Bunshō (1754–96).

References

Works cited

External links
 
 Ippitsusai Bunchō at ukiyo-e.org

1755 births
1790 deaths
Ukiyo-e artists